Francis Rigon (born 3 January 1944) is a French racing cyclist. He rode in the 1969 Tour de France.

References

External links
 

1944 births
Living people
French male cyclists
Cyclists from the Province of Vicenza
Italian male cyclists
Italian emigrants to France